Pargyline (brand name Eutonyl) is an irreversible selective monoamine oxidase (MAO)-B inhibitor drug (IC50 for MAO-A is 0.01152 μmol/L and for MAO-B is 0.00820 μmol/L) It was brought to market in the US and the UK by Abbott in 1963 as  an antihypertensive drug branded "Eutonyl". It was one of several MAO inhibitors introduced in the 1960s including nialamide, isocarboxazid, phenelzine, and tranylcypromine. By 2007 the drug was discontinued and as of 2014 there were no generic versions available in the US. In addition to its actions as an MAOI, pargyline has been found to bind with high affinity to the I2 imidazoline receptor (an allosteric site on the MAO enzyme).

See also
 Clorgyline
 Rasagiline
 Selegiline

References

Abandoned drugs
Propargyl compounds
Amines
Antihypertensive agents
Benzyl compounds
Disulfiram-like drugs
Monoamine oxidase inhibitors